Jacques Moreau (25 August 1933 – 25 January 2017) was a French politician. He served as a Socialist Member of the European Parliament from 1979 to 1984.

References

1933 births
2017 deaths
People from Gironde
Socialist Party (France) MEPs
MEPs for France 1979–1984